= G. A. St Poole =

Commander Giles Antony St. George Poole (25 March 1928, Grantham, Lincolnshire – 25 October 1986) was the Commander of the Sea Wing of the Abu Dhabi Defence Force in 1974, and continued until at least 1979. He was at some point an officer in the British Royal Navy, as the officers of the time were recruited from the Royal Navy or seconded from the Pakistani Navy.

He died in Grantham in 1986.
